The 1937–38 Illinois Fighting Illini men's ice hockey season was the inaugural season of play for the program.

Season
At the end of the great depression, Illinois decided to join fellow Big Ten members Michigan and Minnesota with their own varsity ice hockey team. The university spent more than $30,000 refurbishing the on-campus rink and managed to schedule a few games near the end of the season. The football team's new line coach, Ray Eliot, became the program's first head coach but didn't have much time to get the hastily assembled team to work together.

Paul Salter scored the program's first goal.

Roster

Standings

Schedule and results

|-
!colspan=12 style=";" | Regular Season

‡ Notre Dame's and Chicago's programs were club teams at the time.

References

Illinois Fighting Illini men's ice hockey seasons
Illinois
Illinois
Illinois
Illinois